Lucas Ostiglia (born 3 May 1976, in Buenos Aires) is an Argentine former rugby union footballer. He played as a flanker.

He represented the Argentina national team in 32 occasions, including  the 1999, 2003 and 2007 Rugby World Cups.

External links
UAR profile
Lucas Ostiglia on lequipe.fr

1976 births
Rugby union players from Buenos Aires
Argentine rugby union players
Living people
Rugby union flankers
Argentina international rugby union players
Hindú Club players
Argentina international rugby sevens players
Male rugby sevens players